Prostanthera nivea, commonly known as snowy mint-bush, is a species of flowering plant in the family Lamiaceae and is endemic to eastern Australia. It is a shrub with linear to cylindrical leaves and white flowers arranged in leaf axils near the ends of branchlets and is one of the mint-bushes that is not aromatic.

Description
Flowering occurs from September to December.

Taxonomy
Prostanthera nivea was first formally described in 1834 by George Bentham from an unpublished description by Alan Cunningham. Bentham's description was published in his book Labiatarum Genera et Species.

Bentham described two varieties and the names are accepted by the Australian Plant Census:

Distribution and habitat
Snowy mint-bush grows in forest, woodland and heath in south-eastern Queensland, eastern New South Wales and Victoria. Subspecies induta grows in rocky crevices or on ledges in the Warrumbungles with a single collection from the Pilliga forest.

References

nivea
Flora of Queensland
Flora of New South Wales
Flora of Victoria (Australia)
Lamiales of Australia
Plants described in 1834
Taxa named by Allan Cunningham (botanist)